Angela Minervini is an Italian actress, known for her roles in films such as La visita (1963), Thunder of Battle (1964), Questa sera parla Mark Twain (1965) and Run, Psycho, Run (1968).

Filmography

References

External links
 

Possibly living people
Year of birth missing (living people)
Italian film actresses
Italian stage actresses